Champs-sur-Tarentaine-Marchal is a commune in the Cantal department in south-central France.

Geography
The river Rhue forms all of the commune's southern border.

Population

See also
Communes of the Cantal department

References

Communes of Cantal